Nephelomys meridensis, also known as the Mérida oryzomys, is a species of rodent in the genus Nephelomys of family Cricetidae. It is found in cloud forest in the Sierra Nevada de Mérida of western Venezuela at elevations from 1100 to 4000 m. It is solitary, nocturnal and terrestrial, and has a varied diet.

N. meridensis has thick fur, which is about 11 mm long at the back. The color of the upperparts is rufous, with brown on the head, and becomes lighter towards the sides. The coloration of the underparts, which is well demarcated from that of the upper parts, is greyish, with a pure white area at the chest. The very large ears are covered with thin dark hairs. The hand and feet, whitish in color, are sparsely haired. The tail is brown above and somewhat paler below, and is not well-furred. The incisive foramina, openings in the palate before the molars, are short.

It was first described in 1894 by Oldfield Thomas, who named it Oryzomys meridensis and considered it to be close to O. albigularis (currently Nephelomys albigularis) and O. velutinus (currently included in Hylaeamys megacephalus). In the next two decades, various other species were described in the group of O. albigularis and O. meridensis, which were eventually, in 1944, all consolidated under O. albigularis by Philip Hershkovitz. Because of differences in karyotype and morphology, it was reinstated as a species separate from both O. albigularis and the other Venezuelan member of the group, O. caracolus, in the 1990s. When the species of the O. albigularis group were reclassified into the new genus Nephelomys in 2006, it was retained as a species, now named Nephelomys meridensis. In Táchira, populations with a different karyotype occur, which may represent a different species.

References

Literature cited

Hershkovitz, P. 1944. A systematic review of the Neotropical water rats of the genus Nectomys (Cricetinae). Miscellaneous Publications Museum of Zoology, University of Michigan 58: 1–88.

Thomas, O. 1894. Descriptions of some new Neotropical Muridae. Annals and Magazine of Natural History (6)14:346–365.

Mammals of Venezuela
Nephelomys
Mammals described in 1894
Taxa named by Oldfield Thomas